Calum Þór Bett (born 3 October 1981) is an Icelandic retired footballer who last played for HK.

He is the son of a Scottish father, Jim Bett, and an Icelandic mother, and he is also the brother of Baldur Bett. He formerly played for Aberdeen, Forfar Athletic and Stjarnan. He has also represented Iceland Under-19.

References

External links
 

1981 births
Living people
Calum Bett
Aberdeen F.C. players
Forfar Athletic F.C. players
Scottish Premier League players
Scottish Football League players
Calum Bett
Calum Bett
Calum Bett
Calum Bett
Calum Bett
Association football defenders